The women's doubles competition of the 2021 World Table Tennis Championships was held from 24 to 29 November 2021.

Sun Yingsha and Wang Manyu defeated Mima Ito and Hina Hayata 11–9, 11–7, 11–8 in the final.

Seeds
Seeding was based on the ITTF world ranking published on 16 November 2021. Ranking for doubles competitions was determined by combining a pair’s individual doubles ranking position to form a combined pair ranking.

  Jeon Ji-hee /  Shin Yu-bin (second round, withdrawn)
  Kasumi Ishikawa /  Miu Hirano (quarterfinals)
  Nina Mittelham /  Sabine Winter (third round)
  Doo Hoi Kem /  Lee Ho Ching (third round)
  Linda Bergström /  Christina Källberg (second round)
  Petrissa Solja /  Shan Xiaona (third round)
  Hana Matelová /  Barbora Balážová (third round)
  Yana Noskova /  Olga Vorobeva (third round)
  Farah Abdelaziz /  Yousra Abdel Razek (second round)
  Manika Batra /  Archana Girish Kamath (quarterfinals)
  Sun Yingsha /  Wang Manyu (champions)
  Cheng Hsien-tzu /  Liu Hsing-yin (second round)
  Adriana Díaz /  Melanie Díaz (second round)
  Chen Szu-yu /  Li Yu-jhun (second round)
  Cecilia Akpan /  Offiong Edem (second round, withdrawn)
  Karoline Mischek /  Tin-Tin Ho (second round)

Draw

Finals

Top half

Section 1

Section 2

Bottom half

Section 3

Section 4

References

External links
Draw

Women's doubles